Madran is a Local service district in the Canadian province of New Brunswick.

History

Notable people

See also
List of communities in New Brunswick

References

Communities in Gloucester County, New Brunswick
Designated places in New Brunswick
Local service districts of Gloucester County, New Brunswick